Optimus Rhyme was a hip hop group from Seattle, Washington. Optimus Rhyme is most widely considered a nerdcore group because of the nerdy nature of their lyrics. The name of the band as well as the stage names of the members and many of their lyrics refer to the Transformers franchise. Their music is a combination of rapped hip hop lyrics with funk rock music. Optimus Rhyme formed in Seattle in 2000.

Wheelie Cyberman 
Wheelie Cyberman is the stage name of Andy Hartpence, who is a former web supervisor for Nintendo. He was known as NOA_INDIANA and later NOA_ANDY in the online community Nintendo NSider Forums, and the song Obey The Moderator is based on his experiences moderating the NSider Forums.

Wheelie Cyberman is now performing with the hip-hop group Supercommuter, which also includes Stenobot and Tron Juan.

Discography

AutoBeat EP (2002)
 Dermato Fibro Sarcoma Protuberance
 Sapp
 Tim Garret

Positronic Pathways (2003)
 Incogni2
 DBR
 For the Record
 Officer Weir (Jon-Michael)
 Calm Down

Narcofunk Compilation (2003)
Compilation of Narcofunk artists.
 Compiler

Brobot Demos (2004)
 520
 LED's
 Precognito

Optimus Rhyme (2004)

School the Indie Rockers (2006)

He Dies In Rocket School (2007)

transfORmed EP (2008)
 God Rest Ye Autobeat Allies
 Worms
 Click-Click
 Anxiety
 Daryl Hannah
 Train in Vain (Live at the Croc) - iTunes only
 Guns of Brixton (Live at the Croc)- iTunes only
Other 
 MC Chipmunk (2007) - Myspace only

Other recordings featuring Optimus Rhyme members

Narcofunk Compilation (2005)
Compilation of Narcofunk artists.
 Birthrate of Stars (feat 3D, Wheelie, Broken English)

Like Minds (2005)
Free downloadable album.
 That Sound (featuring Broken English)

MC Frontalot, "Secrets From the Future"
 "Ping Pong Song (Baddd Spellah Remix feat. MC Frontalot)"
(listed on the back cover as "Very Poorly Concealed Secret Track")

References

External links 

Official sites:
 Official website
 Narcofunk Records Optimus Rhyme's record label.

Media coverage:
Optimus Rhyme review in Splendid magazine
Optimus Rhyme review in High Bias magazine
Article on Seattle underground music, featuring Optimus Rhyme, in the Seattle Times
Billboard Magazine article, October 09, 2006
Wired Magazine, "Me So Nerdy", September 2006
"Geeksta Rap Rising", February 2007

Nerdcore artists
Musical groups established in 2000
2000 establishments in Washington (state)
Musical groups from Seattle
Musical groups disestablished in 2008
2008 disestablishments in Washington (state)